Vedensky (masculine), Vedenskaya (feminine), or Vedenskoye (neuter) is the name of several rural localities in Russia:

Vedensky (rural locality), a settlement in Soskovsky District of Oryol Oblast
Vedenskoye, a village in Danilovsky District of Yaroslavl Oblast

See also
Vvedensky (rural locality)